Prominence in topography is a measure of the independence of a summit. 

Prominence or Prominent may also refer to:

Celebrity, fame and public attention accorded by the mass media to individuals or groups 
Prominence (phonetics), stress given to a certain syllable in a word, or to a word in a sentence
Prominence (2015 video game), a science fiction point and click adventure game
Maxillary prominence, part of the face
Solar prominence, a large, bright, gaseous feature extending outward from the Sun's surface
 "Prominent" (song), a song by Bonez MC and RAF Camora
Prominents, moths in the family Notodontidae

See also 

Emphasis (disambiguation)
Eminence (disambiguation)